Paul-Mark Urlovic (born 21 November 1978) is a New Zealand former professional footballer who played as striker for Central United FC in the NRFL Premier Division. Urlovic previously played for Auckland City in the ASB Premiership and Oceania Champions League.

Early life
Urlovic was raised in Auckland and attended Liston College.

Club career
Urlovic was a member of the Auckland City squad that contested the FIFA Club World Cup in Japan in 2006 and UAE in 2009.

International career
After representing New Zealand at U17, U20 and U23 level, Urlovic made his New Zealand full international debut on as a substitute in an 8 - 1 victory over Vanuatu on 28 September 1998. He played 27 A-internationals for the All Whites, between 1998 and 2006 scoring 5 goals.

Honours 
FIFA Confederations Cup Mexico 1999;
Oceania Nations Cup Champions 1998 & 2002;
FIFA Club World Cup Japan 2006 (6th place) & UAE 2009 (5th place);
Oceania Club Champions 2006 & 2009;
NZ National League Champions 1999, 2005, 2006, 2007 & 2009;
Chatham Cup Winners 1997, 1998, 2005, 2007 & 2012;
New Zealand Young Player of the Year 1998
NZ National League Golden Boot 1999;
NRFL Premier Division Golden Boot 2012;
NZ Rep U17. U20, U23 & Full International;

References

External links 
 Paul Urlovic Interview
 Kingz need Urlovic to reach his target

1978 births
People educated at Liston College
Living people
New Zealand people of Croatian descent
New Zealand association footballers
New Zealand international footballers
Melbourne Knights FC players
Football Kingz F.C. players
Auckland City FC players
Central United F.C. players
National Soccer League (Australia) players
Association football forwards
New Zealand Football Championship players
1998 OFC Nations Cup players
1999 FIFA Confederations Cup players
2000 OFC Nations Cup players
2002 OFC Nations Cup players